House of Glam is an American reality television series from Oxygen that premiered on October 5, 2010. The show follows the interactions of the B. Lynn Group, a group of stylists and image consultants. B. Lynn fashion stylists, makeup artists and hairstylists have worked with some of the biggest names in the entertainment industry including Nelly, Jermaine Dupri, Mario, and JoJo.

Cast 

Brandi Simpkins-Owner of the B. Lynn Group
Crystal Streets
Groovey Lew
Amoy Pitters
Atiba Newsome
Mike B.
Michiko
Shaun Gannon

Episodes

References

External links 

2010s American reality television series
2010 American television series debuts
Fashion-themed television series
2010 American television series endings
Television shows set in New York City
Oxygen (TV channel) original programming